Tough Guys Don't Dance is the third album from the Welsh drum and bass producer High Contrast, released on 1 October 2007 on the Hospital Records label.

Track listing 
 "If We Ever" (featuring Diane Charlemagne)
 "Everything's Different" (featuring Ian Shaw)
 "In-A-Gadda-Da-Vida"
 "Kiss Kiss Bang Bang"
 "Forever & A Day" (featuring J'Nay)
 "Sleepless"
 "Tread Softly"
 "Metamorphosis"
 "Pink Flamingos"
 "Eternal Optimist" (featuring J'Nay)
 "Chances" (featuring Linda Gail Lewis)
 "Nobody Gets Out Alive"
 "The Ghost Of Jungle Past"

Sampled Songs 
"If We Ever" includes a vocal sample (Spaceless and timeless... such loveliness) from the 1976 film Network and incorporates elements of "Stand Still" by Aubrey.
"Everything's Different" uses a violin sample from the 1981 horror film The Beyond.
"In-A-Gadda-Da-Vida" is an instrumental cover of the Iron Butterfly song of the same name.
"Kiss Kiss Bang Bang" samples the song "Cry Me a River" by Julie London.
"Sleepless" includes a vocal sample (Don't let those motherfuckers sleep) from the 1987 film Tough Guys Don't Dance.
"Nobody Gets Out Alive" samples the song "Hard Time Killing Floor Blues" by Skip James.

High Contrast albums
2007 albums
Hospital Records albums